KZPY-LP (106.9 FM) was a low-power FM radio station licensed to Marlow, Oklahoma, United States. The station was last owned by In The Zone Radio, Inc.

History
The callsign was KZPY-LP on June 8, 2005. The station's license was cancelled by the Federal Communications Commission on March 3, 2021.

References

External links

ZPY-LP
ZPY-LP
Radio stations established in 2006
2006 establishments in Oklahoma
Radio stations disestablished in 2021
2021 disestablishments in Oklahoma
Defunct radio stations in the United States
ZPY-LP